The Dark Side: The Inside Story of How the War on Terror Turned Into a War on American Ideals is a 2008 non-fiction book written by the American journalist Jane Mayer about Islamic radicalism, the War on Terrorism, and the "closed-doors domestic struggle over whether" U.S. President George W. Bush should have "limitless power to wage it". The book details the origins of controversies such as the coercive interrogation program, in which detainees were tortured, and the NSA electronic surveillance program of domestic surveillance without court warrants.

Reception
The book became a best-seller in non-fiction hardcover in the United States, with its author Jane Mayer booked on various news programs for interviews. It later made the New York Times Book Review editors' list of "10 Best Books of 2008" and was nominated for the 2008 National Book Critics Circle Award in General Nonfiction. The book was a finalist for the National Book Awards.

It also received the Robert F. Kennedy Center for Justice and Human Rights 29th annual book award in 2009, given to an author who "most faithfully and forcefully reflects Robert Kennedy's purposes - his concern for the poor and the powerless, his struggle for honest and even-handed justice, his conviction that a decent society must assure all young people a fair chance, and his faith that a free democracy can act to remedy disparities of power and opportunity."

See also
Enhanced interrogation techniques
Torture Memos
Abu Ghraib torture and prisoner abuse
Extraordinary rendition
Ghost prisoners

References

External links
After Words interview with Mayer on The Dark Side, September 7, 2008

2008 non-fiction books
Books about politics of the United States
Current affairs books
George W. Bush administration controversies
War on Terror books
Doubleday (publisher) books
Helen Bernstein Book Award for Excellence in Journalism